Kamil Ahmet Çörekçi (born 1 February 1992) is a Turkish footballer who plays as a right back for Süper Lig club Hatayspor.

Early life
Born in London, into a family of Turkish Cypriot origin. Çörekçi attended Cateram High School and was a key member of the Redbridge District team Coached by Benn Goddard. This team lifted the London Youth Games football trophy in 2006 for the first time in fifty years also winning the fair play award.

Professional career
Çörekçi began his professional career playing in the youth teams of Fulham and Millwall before he joined Turkish club Bucaspor at the beginning of the 2010–2011 season. He made his professional debut on 28 November 2010.

International career
Çörekçi was born in England and is of Turkish Cypriot descent.
He represents Turkey internationally, and was included in the UEFA Team of the Tournament for his performance in the 2011 UEFA European Under-19 Football Championship.

Honours
Trabzonspor
Turkish Cup (1): 2019–20
Turkish Super Cup (1): 2020

References

External links
 
 
 

1992 births
Living people
Footballers from Greater London
Turkish footballers
Sportspeople of Turkish Cypriot descent
Turkey under-21 international footballers
Turkey youth international footballers
English footballers
Turkish people of Cypriot descent
English people of Turkish descent
English people of Turkish Cypriot descent
Süper Lig players
Fulham F.C. players
Millwall F.C. players
Bucaspor footballers
Kayserispor footballers
Adana Demirspor footballers
Eskişehirspor footballers
Trabzonspor footballers
Hatayspor footballers
Association football fullbacks
Association football midfielders
English expatriate footballers